Villarán may refer to:

Susana Villarán (born 1949), Peruvian politician
Villarán Bridge, bridge in Canóvanas, Puerto Rico